James Rankin may refer to:

 Sir James Rankin, 1st Baronet (1842–1915), British Member of Parliament
 James Rankin (lighthouse keeper) (1844–1921), American lighthouse keeper
 James Palmer Rankin (1855–1934), physician and political figure in Ontario, Canada
 J. Lee Rankin (1907–1996), U.S. Solicitor General
 James Rankin (RAF officer) (1913–1975), RAF flying ace during World War II
 James Rankin (Ohio politician) (1926–1978), Ohio House of Representatives
 James Rankin (footballer) (1927–1985), English footballer
 James Stuart Rankin (1880–1960), British Member of Parliament for Liverpool East Toxteth, 1916–1924
 James Rankin (badminton), Irish badminton player